Stephen C. Kirk (born May 25, 1959) is an American former handball player who competed in the 1984 Summer Olympics and in the 1988 Summer Olympics.

References

1981 BME Villanova University 
1990 MBA Pepperdine University

1959 births
Living people
American male handball players
Olympic handball players of the United States
Handball players at the 1984 Summer Olympics
Handball players at the 1988 Summer Olympics
People from Rockville Centre, New York
Sportspeople from Nassau County, New York